The 1967 Ottawa Rough Riders finished the season in 2nd place in the Eastern Conference with a 9–4–1 record and lost in the Eastern Finals to the Hamilton Tiger-Cats.

Preseason

Regular season

Standings

Schedule

Postseason

Awards and honours
 Bo Scott, Running back, CFL All-Star
 Whit Tucker, Receiver, CFL All-Star
 Roger Perdrix, Guard, CFL All-Star
 Gene Gaines, Defensive back, CFL All-Star

References

Ottawa Rough Riders Season, 1967
Ottawa Rough Riders seasons